Derez De'Shon Lenard (born March 25, 1989), formerly known as D-Dash, is an American rapper and singer. He is best known for his single "Hardaway", which peaked at number 61 on the Billboard Hot 100.

Early life 
Lenard was born on March 25, 1989, in Atlanta, Georgia.

Career 
Although Lenard gained some recognition with singles like "Emotionz" and "Came a Long Way", he wouldn't break out into the mainstream until his single "Hardaway" was released. It became his first Billboard charting single, peaking at number 61 on the Billboard Hot 100.

Discography

Studio albums

Mixtapes

Singles

References 

Musicians from Atlanta
1989 births
Living people